Originally created in 1967, the fictional comic book character Barbara Gordon has been adapted into various other forms of media. The character has appeared in both live action and animated television series and films, as well as in video games in her alter-egos as both Batgirl and Oracle.

Film

Live-action

Batman & Robin
In 1997, Alicia Silverstone portrayed Barbara Wilson/Batgirl in the film Batman & Robin. Unlike in the comics, it is not stated that this version of Barbara is James Gordon's daughter, but that she is Alfred Pennyworth's niece. Screenwriter Akiva Goldsman said this change was done because Alfred was more central of a character than Jim Gordon was in their story. She is Dick Grayson's love interest, and depicted as a blonde instead of a red-head in the comics. Barbara's Batgirl suit in the film is completely different from the one from the comics as it lacks gold accents and has a Robin-style domino mask. Like Batman and Robin, she also briefly wears a silvery arctic version of her suit with a cowl (similar to the one in the comics).

The Dark Knight
In 2008, Hannah Gunn briefly portrayed "Gordon's Daughter" in The Dark Knight, credited as such, as she is not named in the film.

Batgirl
In March 2017, it was announced that Joss Whedon was in talks to write, direct and produce a Batgirl film as part of the DC Extended Universe. Whedon was to begin production on the film in 2018, but stepped down in February 2018.

In April 2018, after impressing the studio with her work on the forthcoming film Birds of Prey, Christina Hodson was hired as screenwriter for Batgirl.

In May 2021, Adil El Arbi and Bilall Fallah were announced as the film's co-directors, with plans to release the film on HBO Max. Kristin Burr will produce the project. Leslie Grace was ultimately cast as the titular character. Batgirl was scheduled for Warner Bros. Pictures 2022–2023 release slate.

In August 2022, it was reported that the film has been cancelled by Warner Bros. because of cost-cutting measures and it was half-finished filming.

Animation

Batman: Under the Red Hood
Barbara Gordon is directly alluded to in Batman: Under the Red Hood when Jason Todd mentions "the friends the Joker has crippled" to Batman, most likely referencing to the night the Joker shot her to drive James Gordon insane.

 The character makes non-speaking appearances in the short Death in the Family as Oracle.

Batman: Bad Blood
Barbara Gordon made a brief cameo in her "Batgirl of Burnside" costume at end of Batman: Bad Blood.

Batman: The Killing Joke
Tara Strong reprised her role as Barbara Gordon in Batman: The Killing Joke. Her Batgirl costume resembles the one from The New Batman Adventures and her debut appearance in Detective Comics #359. Batgirl's role in the film was expanded from the source material, including depicting her decision to retire as Batgirl just before the Joker's attack after a tense case with a ruthless gang leader, as well as an encounter with Batman that ended with them having sex. There is also a post-credits scene where Barbara, some time after recovering in the hospital, now operates as Oracle. Barbara's role and portrayal in the film (which differs heavily from most other portrayals) has been heavily criticized as "cheap, misogynistic writing".

Batman and Harley Quinn
In Batman and Harley Quinn, a waitress wearing an exotic version of Batgirl's costume makes a cameo appearance.

Scooby-Doo! & Batman: The Brave and the Bold
In the 2018 animated crossover film Scooby-Doo! & Batman: The Brave and the Bold, near the plot's climax Daphne Blake dons an old Batgirl costume which - with the mask and hood up - makes her strongly resemble Batgirl from the Batman: The Brave and the Bold animated series as well as Batgirl's appearance from her debut in Detective Comics #359 and in the Silver Age comics.

Teen Titans Go! To the Movies
Batgirl makes a silent cameo appearance in the movie.

Batman vs. Teenage Mutant Ninja Turtles
In the 2019 crossover film Batman vs. Teenage Mutant Ninja Turtles, Batgirl (voiced by Rachel Bloom) plays an important role as both a scientist and a crime-fighter. She encounters the Turtles during a robbery by the Foot Clan and mistakenly believes that they are the thieves. She later forms a close bond with Donatello, working on a retromutagen with him and later accompanying him through Arkham Asylum.

Batman: Hush
Peyton R. List voices Barbara Gordon / Batgirl in the animated Batman: Hush film.

Justice League Dark: Apokolips War
Batgirl has a non-speaking role in Justice League Dark: Apokolips War. In the film, she is seen fighting against Apokolips' forces alongside Batwoman before being gruesomely dismembered by the Paradooms.

Space Jam: A New Legacy
Barbara Gordon has a non-speaking cameo appearance in the 2021 film Space Jam: A New Legacy. She is shown with other members of the Justice League after Superman stopped a runaway train that Daffy Duck caused.

Lego versions

The LEGO Batman Movie
Rosario Dawson voiced Barbara Gordon in The LEGO Batman Movie. This incarnation is the new Police Commissioner of the Gotham City Police Department after her father retires. But when the Joker causes chaos around the city and releases a few major non-DC comics villains from the Phantom Zone, Barbara helps Batman, Robin, and Alfred recapture the villains, and later on after she and the gang team up with the original Joker Gang, Barbara becomes Batgirl. Her Batgirl costume is purple with gold accents to reflect the costume from the '60s TV series.

LEGO DC Comics Super Heroes: Justice League: Gotham City Breakout
Batgirl appears in LEGO DC Comics Super Heroes: Justice League - Gotham City Breakout, voiced by Sarah Hyland.

LEGO DC Comics Super Heroes: Aquaman: Rage of Atlantis
Batgirl appears in LEGO DC Comics Super Heroes: Aquaman - Rage of Atlantis, voiced by Alyson Stoner.

LEGO DC Batman: Family Matters
Batgirl appears in LEGO DC Batman - Family Matters, voiced again by Alyson Stoner.

Television

Live-action

Batman

Librarian Barbara Gordon and her alter ego Batgirl were portrayed by Yvonne Craig in the third season of the Batman television series (1967–1968), where she appeared in all 26 episodes. Months before her debut, Barbara Gordon had been discussed by her father and Batman in the second-season episodes, "Batman's Waterloo" and "The Duo Defy". Her Batgirl costume color was purple with gold accents and it also incorporated a long red wig to hide her real avocado-style, black hair.

In a promotional short, librarian Barbara Gordon encounters millionaire Bruce Wayne and his "youthful ward" Dick Grayson at the Gotham City Public Library. As Gordon and Wayne become acquainted, Killer Moth and his henchmen (in full costume) discuss a plan of attack. One henchman suggests taking Bruce Wayne hostage, but Killer Moth shows reluctance, due to Wayne's alleged friendship with Batman. Moth directs the group to kidnap Wayne's business acquaintance instead, who also happens to be a billionaire. When Bruce Wayne and Dick Grayson realize the presence of their adversaries, they quickly leave the library to change into Batman and Robin.

Meanwhile, Gordon is locked in the library's office by Killer Moth's henchmen, however, it is revealed there is a secret chamber within the office where she changes into Batgirl. When Batman and Robin arrive to apprehend Moth and his gang, all parties are shocked at the arrival of a Batgirl. Batman, Robin, and Batgirl defeat the villains with relative ease and Batgirl vanishes without revealing her secret identity. Batgirl's costume in the episode closely resembles that later seen in the series, though the design of her mask changes. The short also featured a unique version of the Batman theme, ending with the lyric "Batgirl!" rather than the usual "Batman!" (and accompanied by an appropriately modified Batman logo).

The promotional short was able to renew the series for a third season and add Batgirl to its regular cast. Batgirl's official debut was in the episode "Enter Batgirl, Exit Penguin". The Penguin kidnaps Commissioner Gordon's daughter Barbara, binds her to a chair and gags her, and hides her in the next-door apartment which is being redecorated. The dynamic duo make it their mission to rescue her. The Penguin plans to marry her, thinking that becoming Commissioner Gordon's son-in-law would make him immune from arrest. He ungags her and forces her to agree to this by threatening to have Gordon killed. Pretending to be locked behind a secured door, Barbara makes her transformation into Batgirl and assists Batman and Robin in defeating the Penguin as they have been gassed and hung over a vat of acid. During the episode, Alfred Pennyworth discovers her secret identity - but he vows never to reveal it. He claims she left a few minutes ago when the fight has finished, by which time Barbara has changed back.

During the third season, Batgirl aided Batman and Robin in solving several mysteries and even saved them from near death by herself on several occasions. Unfortunately, Batgirl's addition to the cast was not enough to save the series from cancellation. Although the promotional short has been mistakenly thought of as a pilot for Batgirl's own spin-off, it is highly unlikely ABC would have agreed to give her her own series since Batman had been in danger of cancellation since the end of its first season. According to the book DC Comics: Sixty Years of the World's Favorite Comic Book Heroes, Batgirl's addition to the cast "was a sign of desperation. Ratings were down and there was hope that a new character might give the show a shot in the arm."

Yvonne Craig once again appeared as Batgirl in a 1972 television commercial supporting women's rights (specifically, equal pay).

The 2003 made-for-TV film Return to the Batcave: The Misadventures of Adam and Burt included scenes recreating the filming of the 1960s TV series. Erin Carufel plays Yvonne Craig / Batgirl, in the film.

Birds of Prey

Barbara Gordon appeared as Oracle as one of the main characters in Birds of Prey, played by Dina Meyer. The series was loosely based on the comic book of the same name.

In the 70 minute pilot episode, Alfred Pennyworth narrates the events which have led to the formation of the Birds of Prey. Years ago, when Batman defended the streets of Gotham City, he fathered a daughter to Catwoman which he never knew about. After the birth of her daughter Helena, Selena Kyle gave up her life as Catwoman and raised her child as a single mother. Bruce Wayne, apparently oblivious to the fact that he has a child, continues to fight crime in Gotham as Batman. Alfred tells that he "had trained many protégés over the years and one of them was Barbara Gordon, who called herself Batgirl." As Batman and Batgirl continued to fight the Joker for control of the city, the battle came to an end with Joker's loss. However, the Joker swore revenge not on Batman himself, but on those he loved. While a hit-man was sent to murder Catwoman, the Joker, in a scene adapted directly from The Killing Joke, guns down Barbara at her apartment. With Gordon paralyzed and Kyle dead, Batman abandons Gotham, never to be seen again.

Seven years later, in the present day, Barbara Gordon has now become "Oracle" and has adopted and trained Helena Kyle; the vigilante known as The Huntress. They soon adopt Dinah Redmond and the three vow to protect the city of New Gotham. During the series, Oracle is briefly reunited with Black Canary, described as her original partner in Birds of Prey (and the mother of Dinah Redmond), and in one episode dons the Batgirl costume once more to face off with Lady Shiva (while using an electronic device that allows her to temporarily walk again). In the final episode, she is able to improve her spine replacement device enough to engage in combat for several minutes though she collapses at the end of the battle. The series would last a total of thirteen episodes, leaving the mystery of Batman's whereabouts unresolved. However, a phone conversation with Alfred in Wayne Manor implies that the Dark Knight has monitored Birds of Prey activities in the city and knows of his daughter's existence.

Laeta Kalogridis planned several series highlights for the second season, including Dick Grayson's reintroduction (prompting a Barbara/Helena argument), as well as Koriand'r possibly appearing. Ollie Queen/Green Arrow would have joined Dinah, and thus the series would have progressed with a Cassandra Cain episode as well.

Dina Meyer additionally reprises her role as Barbara Gordon in a vocal capacity in the Arrowverse crossover event "Crisis on Infinite Earths".

Arrow
Barbara Gordon's Oracle persona was briefly mentioned in the Arrow episode "A.W.O.L," where Oliver mentions that the reason he didn't choose Oracle as Felicity Smoak's codename is because it was taken, referencing Barbara Gordon possibly existing in the Arrowverse.

Titans
Barbara appears in the third season of the HBO Max series Titans, portrayed by Savannah Welch. The series depicts her as the Commissioner of the Gotham City Police Department and retired from her Batgirl persona after being paralyzed by the Joker. She also notably had her right leg amputated, a trait that was implemented following the casting of Welch, who is a real-life amputee. Prior to her first physical appearance, she is referenced in the season 1 finale "Dick Grayson" during a dark fantasy that Trigon subjects Dick Grayson to where it was mentioned that Barbara is missing. In season 3, Barbara has taken over the mantle of Commissioner, after her father Jim was murdered by Mr. Freeze. Dick visits Gotham City after hearing about Jason Todd's death, where he and Barbara argue about Bruce's lack of empathy toward the deaths of their loved ones, and his obsession with crimefighting. When Bruce goes missing after killing the Joker, Barbara begins to work with Dick and the Titans to take down the new villain Red Hood, who later reveals himself as a resurrected Jason.

Season 3 also features the appearance of Oracle, depicted as an advanced artificial intelligence computer system located in the GCPD headquarters. Once used by Batman to take down Jonathan Crane / Scarecrow, Oracle was shut down willingly to avoid government scrutiny. Dick convinces Barbara to reactivate Oracle to locate Crane. However, upon finding out that Crane has managed to hack into Oracle's systems, Barbara decides to deactivate Oracle permanently, much to Dick's dismay.

While the series was being developed for TNT, Barbara was intended to appear as the team's hacker, but her role was ultimately reduced.

Gotham
Barbara Gordon, renamed Barbara Lee Gordon, appears in the fifth and final season of Gotham, portrayed by Jeté Laurence. She is taken hostage by Jeremiah Valeska, the twisted criminal intending to lure her father into a trap, which leads to the debut of Bruce Wayne's new vigilante role.

Batwoman
The Batwoman episode "I'll Give You A Clue" which features the live action debut of Stephanie Brown that also incorporates elements of Barbara Gordon.

Animation

The Adventures of Batman

The Barbara Gordon version of Batgirl made her first animated appearance in the 1968 series The Adventures of Batman, voiced by Jane Webb. Her Batgirl costume is now a gray bodysuit (similar to Batman's) along with gold colored gloves, boots, bat-symbol and utility belt while her blue cape and cowl from the comics is retained. Also, the colors of the costume from the show are later adopted in the Bronze Age comics from the 1970s through the early 1980s. Barbara Gordon, this time working in the District Attorney's office instead of being a librarian, made several appearances in both her civilian persona and as her alter ego in the 1977 Saturday morning animated series The New Adventures of Batman. Adam West and Burt Ward reprised their roles to provide the voices for Batman and Robin, but Jane Webb was replaced by Melendy Britt for the voice of Batgirl.

Super Friends

Although not appearing in the television show, Batgirl does appear in some of the merchandise produced for the show using her design from The Adventures of Batman and the Bronze Age comics.

DC Animated Universe
Barbara Gordon has appeared in the DC Animated Universe, voiced by Melissa Gilbert in Batman: The Animated Series, Mary Kay Bergman in Batman & Mr. Freeze: SubZero, Tara Strong in The New Batman Adventures, Batman: Mystery of the Batwoman and Gotham Girls, Stockard Channing in the first two seasons of Batman Beyond, and Angie Harmon in the last season of Batman Beyond and Batman Beyond: Return of the Joker.

Batman: The Animated Series

In Batman: The Animated Series, Barbara Gordon is introduced in the two-part episode "Heart of Steel", where she assists Batman in saving her father James Gordon from the evil A.I. supercomputer HARDAC . She makes her first appearance as Batgirl in the two-part episode "Shadow of the Bat" in which Commissioner Gordon is framed for corruption. Barbara asks Batman to appear at a public rally to support Gordon but the Dark Knight declines, citing more important things to do in investigating who framed Gordon. Barbara then decides to impersonate Batman at the rally, intending only to be seen in the shadows. But when there is a drive-by shooting, she leaps into action to assist. Robin appears as well and attempts to grab her, accidentally ripping the back of her mask which causes her hair to spill out. When media articles the next day ask the question "Who is Batgirl?", Barbara decides she can accomplish her goal with greater ease as Batgirl than as a civilian and redesigns her costume as a more contrast from Batman's. Her Batgirl costume is exactly the same from The Adventures of Batman and from the Bronze Age comics, but with blue gloves and boots instead of yellow ones to reflect Batman's costume while retaining the same gold bat-symbol and utility belt from the comics, and yet simple due to at the time having no access to Batman's resources. She discovers that Gill Mason of the GCPD (under Two-Face's orders) is behind the frame-up and goes to rescue her father, only to complicate the rescue already underway by Batman and Robin. In the end, Batgirl is the one who captures Mason. Although Batman had been critical of her at first, the Dark Knight changes this thinking after witnessing her capabilities. Barbara's final appearance is in the episode "Batgirl Returns" in which she is seen having a flirting relationship with her classmate Dick Grayson at Gotham State University. In the movie Batman & Mr. Freeze: SubZero, Barbara Gordon appears a central character and her age is revealed to be 20. She is first seen wearing her Batgirl costume while fighting a thug. She is then kidnapped by an associate of Mr. Freeze because she is an exact match for a transplant needed to save Nora Fries. The bulk of the film showcases Barbara using her skills to evade Mr. Freeze while trying to escape her captor's hideout. Despite being against Mr. Freeze, Barbara admits that she feels sorry for Nora and is willing to do the transfusion but only in a hospital. Eventually, Batman and Robin locate her, and the three of them manage to destroy Mr. Freeze's hideout and escape. It's also shown in this film that Barbara is in a relationship with Dick.

The New Batman Adventures

During The New Batman Adventures, Barbara Gordon appears as Batgirl as a recurring character. Batgirl is eventually allowed into the Batcave and becomes a main character and is Batman's main partner. Batgirl was made an addition to the cast with producer Bruce Timm stating, "The consumer products division and the people at the WB wanted to make sure kids would watch the show, so they strongly suggested we include Batgirl and Tim Drake (as Robin) as a way of courting young girl audiences as well as young boys...We liked the Batgirl character and I certainly didn't mind putting her in the show." It is also shown in the series that her previous relationship with Dick Grayson did not last. The episode "You Scratch My Back" emphasized this, portraying her relationship with Nightwing as strenuous and the episode "Old Wounds" shows how it ended with Barbara eventually discovering Bruce and Dick's secret identities and Dick realizing that Bruce knew and never told him quits as Robin and leaves Gotham. The episode "Over the Edge" also implies this as Nightwing "can't believe it ended like this for us or Barbara". The episode "Girls' Night Out" establishes Batgirl and Supergirl (Kara Kent) as close friends. Along with all other characters in the series, Barbara's civilian and superhero identity were redesigned. Her Batgirl costume was changed to a black body suit with yellow gloves, boots, bat-symbol and utility belt to match her original comic book design seen in Detective Comics #359. In the movie Batman: Mystery of the Batwoman, Barbara Gordon appears briefly when she calls Bruce Wayne to find out who Batwoman is. She expresses jealousy and Bruce dodges the issue by faking cellular phone problems. This is Barbara's only scene in the film and hints a crush on Bruce which she expresses with hinting that she misses Bruce.

Batman Beyond

Barbara Gordon appears in Batman Beyond. No longer the vigilante she was in her youth, this version is a grim, bitter old woman that is the current Police Commissioner. Her history is also a little revised: she and Bruce Wayne developed a romantic relationship at one point, after Dick Grayson had left. Despite that she and Bruce are no longer together, she does care and wishes for Bruce to be happy. She resents Wayne dragging Terry McGinnis as a new Batman as she believes Bruce did with all of his previous partners. Unlike her father, she states that vigilante justice "went out with the tommy gun" and insists Terry to give up being Batman. But she develops respect for the new Batman, assisting her in defending her husband Gotham District Attorney Sam Young from assassin Curaré. While she never officially endorses or helps him (as she never uses a Bat-Signal), she no longer threatens to turn him in and continually looks the other way, acknowledging his assistance in some cases even if she never asks for it. On one occasion, she was prepared to arrest Terry when she apparently witnessed the second Batman murder the criminal bomber Mad Stan despite the fact that Terry's arrest would compromise her and Bruce's secret. However, Bruce and Terry succeeded in revealing that Spellbinder had simply created an illusion of Mad Stan's death; she subsequently awarded Terry with a civic service award as an apology. The precise future of her and Dick's relationship remains unknown but Barbara tells Terry to "try looking up for Nightwing sometime" about how Bruce treated partners. When the Joker returns from the dead, Terry McGinnis goes to her when Bruce Wayne refuses to talk about how this cannot be the Clown Price of Crime. When Bruce is recovering from the Joker's toxin, she reluctantly tells Terry the details: the Joker kidnapped, tortured and brainwashed Tim Drake into a miniature version of himself. During the chaos, Batgirl faced off against Harley Quinn and watched as Harley fell to her death, unaware that she had actually survived. Tim killed the Joker and covered up the events with her father's aid a year before Tim's recovery from his trauma and Bruce forbade Tim from being Robin again as Tim soon left after this. Barbara also temporarily takes Bruce's place in advising Terry while tracking a couple of suspects as possible candidates for the Joker's true identity. She and Bruce visit Tim recovering in the hospital after the Joker's final defeat by Terry with Bruce reconciling his relationship with Tim.

Gotham Girls

Barbara Gordon is also a featured character in Gotham Girls. A joint production of Warner Bros. and Noodle Soup Productions, the series stars Batgirl protecting Gotham City from the criminal activities of Catwoman, Poison Ivy and Harley Quinn. Although not restricted to the animated continuity, the main characters were adapted from The New Batman Adventures.

Justice League
The character also made several brief cameo appearances in Justice League. While the Bat Embargo forbade the use of her character for the majority of the time, she appears in the episode "The Savage Time" [Pt. I] in the alternate timeline where she can be seen kissing Dick Grayson (as confirmed by the show's producers) and mentioned briefly in the episode "Comfort and Joy". Barbara Gordon was originally planned to appear in Justice League Unlimited. The episode "Double Date" (scripted by Birds of Prey author Gail Simone) would have also featured Oracle's animated debut. But due to the restrictions on Batman-related characters, she was replaced with Green Arrow and the Question.

The Batman

 Unlike previous Batman series, this version is established as Batman's first official sidekick instead of Dick Grayson which was also different from the comics. This was due to the fact that Dick Grayson/Robin could not be used in the show at the time due to Robin appearing in the simultaneously running Teen Titans show. 

Barbara Gordon appears on The Batman, with Batgirl voiced by Danielle Judovits, and Oracle voiced by Kellie Martin. She replaced Ellen-Yin as Batman's female ally for Season three onward. Her Batgirl costume color is purple along with a black cape, cowl, gloves and boots with dark purple highlights (which is an homage to the Batgirl costume from the 60's TV series) along with a gold bat-symbol and utility belt and has white eye lenses for the first time.

She was first mentioned on the episode "Night and the City" and made her first appearance on the two-part episode "Batgirl Begins". This version is the teenage daughter of James Gordon and a student of Gotham High. Though an excellent gymnast, she has lost interest in gymnastics; however, her father wants her to continue in the hope she might attend an Olympic Games. Although not as interested in gymnastics, she finds police detective work fascinating - which worries her father. In addition to that, Barbara associates with her close friend Pamela Isley, a fellow student with a juvenile-detention record - something James does not like. During a battle with Temblor in the Chlorogene lab, Barbara sees Batman in action; after this, the seed to use her Batgirl persona is planted. The battle also causes Pamela to become the villainess Poison Ivy after an experimental plant mutagen fell upon her former friend. Batgirl arrives at Poison Ivy's lair to help Batman save Gordon (though she originally wanted to save her friend from getting into more trouble) only to find Batman under Poison Ivy's mind control. Batgirl is then forced to fight Batman. During the battle, she beat Batman in hand-to-hand combat by kicking the Dark Knight into a pond which freed Batman of Poison Ivy's control. After she defeated Poison Ivy and saved her father, Batman decides not to tell Gordon that his daughter is Batgirl. That first adventure, Batgirl says is 'only the beginning'. During her initial introduction, she demands to be called "Batwoman" until Commissioner Gordon calls her by the Batgirl name.

She aids the Dark Knight with numerous cases, proving herself as a trusted ally. Batman himself, despite never asking to have a partner, becomes fond of working with her - though would not admit it. At one point, in the episode "A Dark Knight to Remember", she has figured out that Batman is secretly Bruce Wayne as the billionaire is physically fit and can afford to purchase equipment that Batman would require. But Wayne had partial amnesia during that time which made Bruce lose the memory as the Dark Knight Detective which threw Barbara off. After she and Batman saved Gotham from Maxie Zeus's siege in the episode "Thunder", the Dark Knight gave her some spare gadgets and accepted her as a partner as she was in the loop, marking the only time Batgirl is Batman's first sidekick instead of Robin, which was different from the comics due to having Robin's character in another DC animated television series.

Batman finally let Barbara in on his own secret in the episode "Team Penguin" after getting Dick Grayson as a second partner. Deciding they needed teamwork training and to learn to trust one another more, the trio shares their secret identities (but Batgirl is reluctant to give up hers so Batman does it for her) and begins training. She and Robin develop a sibling-like relationship throughout the show, and gets annoyed when Robin refers to her as "Babs". In the two-part episode "The Joining", she participated in the battle to save Earth with Robin from the alien technological entity known as The Joining.

The episode "Artifacts" features her adult incarnation using a wheelchair (under unknown circumstances) using her Oracle identity. Oracle manages the cyber realms and has a joking yet more adult-like relationship to Nightwing. The distant future shows Batgirl, Batman and Robin are now legends similar to Robin Hood and the Merry Men and she's also known in these stories as Batwoman.

In the episode "Joker Express", Batgirl was under the Joker's control and Batman and Robin have perforce to fight her. While Robin was almost killed, Batman fought Batgirl briefly. The Dark Knight defeated her by making Barbara inhale an incapacitating gas which eventually restores her to normal after her body and mind begin to relax. In the episode "Attack of the Terrible Trio", it is revealed that Barbara has graduated from Gotham High School at an early age and enrolled in Gotham University.

In the two-part series finale, Barbara and Robin once again join the battle against The Joining with the Justice League after they lost their powers. After The Joining is once again defeated, she and Robin discuss the idea of forming their own junior Justice League.

Batman: The Brave and The Bold
The Barbara Gordon incarnation of Batgirl appears in Batman: The Brave and the Bold, voiced by Mae Whitman. Her Batgirl costume is exactly the same in the comics and her debut in Detective Comics #359. In the teaser of the episode "The Last Patrol!", she saves Batman from Killer Moth in a flashback. In a present-day scene of the teaser, she and Batman end up in one of the Penguin's death traps. She returns in the episode "The Criss Cross Conspiracy!" in which she and Nightwing have to work alongside Batman (in Batwoman's body) and Felix Faust to save Batwoman (in Batman's body) at the mercy of the Riddler. Additionally, the fourth wall-breaking series finale "Mitefall!" sees Bat-Mite altering reality to make Batman: The Brave and the Bold "jump the shark" so that it will be cancelled and replaced with a more serious Batman series. In the end, he succeeds, and an in-universe commercial for the (fictional) replacement series reveals that the new show will focus on Batgirl instead, with Batman as a supporting character. Ambush Bug then compounds Bat-Mite's initial disappointment by pointing out that a darker, more serious series like the Batgirl show he has just instigated would not use a character as silly as Bat-Mite, leading the anti-hero to disappear into nothingness.

Young Justice
Barbara Gordon appears in Young Justice, voiced by Alyson Stoner. In the episode "Homefront", she is portrayed as a student at the Gotham Academy alongside Dick Grayson and Artemis Crock. She also had a cameo appearance in the episode "Failsafe" of standing in the crowd with Alfred Pennyworth. In Young Justice: Invasion, Batgirl has joined the Team during the five-year gap. She helps Wonder Girl (Cassie Sandsmark) rescue U.N. Secretary General Tseng from Lobo. Her Batgirl costume is a gray bodysuit with black accents to mirror that of Batman's. In the episode "Alienated", she had a cameo with the rest of the Bat-Family invading a Krolotean facility. Batgirl returns in the episode "Beneath" as part of a team sent to investigate The Light's activities in Bialya. In the tie-in comics, she's shown to have a romantic interest in Dick Grayson, and appears to have a "friends with benefits" relationship. In Young Justice: Outsiders, Barbara is now the wheelchair-using Oracle, and is in a relationship with Dick Grayson. In Young Justice: Phantoms, it is revealed Barbara became paralyzed by Orphan accidentally slashing her.

Super Best Friends Forever
Barbara Gordon appears as one of the lead characters in Super Best Friends Forever, with Tara Strong reprising her role. She is cheerful, and a go-getter to the rest of the group. Her Batgirl costume is purple with gold accents, which resembles her costume from the 60's TV series.

Beware the Batman
Barbara Gordon appears in Beware the Batman, with Tara Strong reprising her role. Her kidnapping and rescue in "Allies" plays a role in cementing the beginning of Batman and Commissioner Gordon's partnership. In "Darkness", Barbara overhears a conversation between Katana and Gordon in how to disable the Ion Cortex's AI. She attempts to try to help out by stealing a police van and attempting to use the computers in it. Her father catches her, but eventually agrees to help her. Batman gives her the password to the Cortex ("Oracle") so she can hack it and take it down. The following episode, "Reckoning", forces her and her dad to infiltrate the lair of Ra's al Ghul to take down the Cortex, saving Gotham City in the process. After the black-out, she continues to assist Katana and Batman, taking the codename of Oracle. In "Alone", she joins other Outsiders such as Metamorpho and Man-Bat in assisting in the final battle against Deathstroke. According to producer Glen Murakami, if season two had been produced, Barbara would have become the show's version of Robin, with a resemblance to Carrie Kelley.

Teen Titans Go!
Batgirl makes appearances in Teen Titans Go!, voiced by Tara Strong once again. She makes a cameo appearance at Titans East's party in the episode "Starliar" when seen dancing next to Aqualad before Robin obnoxiously cuts in. She is later seen in the episode "Staring at the Future" shown to be the future wife of Nightwing and the mother of their three babies. Her design resembles her appearance from The New Batman Adventures and her debut design from Detective Comics #359.

DC Super Hero Girls
Batgirl appears as a central protagonist in the web series DC Super Hero Girls, with Mae Whitman reprising her role from Batman: The Brave and the Bold. She is a student at Super Hero High, is an extremely intelligent genius. She is a tomboy and loves to investigate criminals. The character is also a central protagonist in the television series of the same name, with Tara Strong reprising her role. In the series, she is a student at Metropolis High. Her Batgirl costume is once again purple with gold accents. She is known to be bubbly, cheerful, upbeat and downright optimistic. She is the one who wants everyone to get along and is often seen as the "cheerleader" in the group because of her contagious enthusiasm and zest for life. However, she is a fangirl and her ambitious nature makes her destined to be Batman's future sidekick. She is also a creative problem solver and will use her creativity and her surprisingly analytical thinking to stop the bad guys and be the glue in her friendships.

Justice League Action
Barbara Gordon's Batgirl costume from The New Batman Adventures appears as an easter egg in Justice League Action in the episode "Play Date".

Harley Quinn
Barbara Gordon appears in Harley Quinn, voiced by Briana Cuoco. Introduced in the season 2 episode "Riddle U", she is seen as a student and tour guide living in Riddler University. After seeing her father hit rock bottom and helping the titular character defeat Riddler, she becomes inspired to assume the identity of Batgirl. In the episode "Batman's Back Man", she proved to be effective in fighting crime and is appointed by Batman as his temporary replacement. In the episode "There's No Place to Go But Down", Barbara reveals her identity as Batgirl to her father and helps him take down Two-Face. In the following episode, "Inner (Para) Demons", after Gordon becomes Commissioner again and is told by the President of the United States that he needs to kill Harley in order for Gotham to rejoin the U.S., Barbara unsuccessfully tries to dissuade him, and later warns Harley that Gordon will be coming after her.

Video games
Barbara Gordon has also been adapted into several video games as both playable and non-playable characters. She appears as Oracle in the video game Batman: Dark Tomorrow and as Batgirl in the video games Batman: Rise of Sin Tzu and Batman Vengeance with Tara Strong reprising her role in both of them. In Batman Vengeance, Batgirl is not playable; her role is comparable to Oracle's. These games are available on Nintendo GameCube, PlayStation 2, and Xbox.
Batgirl is an unlockable character in Lego Batman: The Videogame, with vocal effects provided by Grey DeLisle. She can be played during free play. She shares Batman's attacks and suits.
Oracle appears in DC Universe Online, voiced by Kathy Catmull. She guides hero players through the story line missions and alerts the players to mission information and objectives to complete. She also alerts the players to new seasonal events when they are available.
Batgirl appears in Lego Batman 2: DC Super Heroes as an unlockable character and a minor ally, voiced by Kari Wahlgren.
Batgirl appears in Young Justice: Legacy as a playable character, voiced by Danica McKellar.
Batgirl is the second DLC character to be released in Injustice: Gods Among Us, with Kimberly Brooks reprising the role from the Batman: Arkham series. From the Regime universe, Oracle originally supplied information to the Insurgency using her superior knowledge of technology to avoid detection by the Regime but after her father Jim Gordon died from cancer (accelerated by the Kryptonite pill), she took up the Batgirl mantle and set out to stop Superman and the Regime.
Batgirl appears in Scribblenauts Unmasked: A DC Comics Adventure. In the Arkham Asylum level, she and Maxwell go up against Scarecrow and Doppelganger. Afterwards, Maxwell goes back in time to fix her spine.
Batgirl appears in Lego Batman 3: Beyond Gotham as a playable character, with Kimberly Brooks reprising her role once more.
The Lego Batman Movie version of Batgirl is playable in Lego Dimensions.
Batgirl appears as a boss and a playable character in Lego DC Super-Villains, voiced again by Tara Strong. She and Nightwing attempt to take down a group of Gotham's worst villains, led by the Joker, during their raid on the GCPD. They pursue the villains to the Iceberg Lounge, where they are eventually defeated by Catwoman, Riddler, and Clayface; but Owlman defeats the crooks for them.
Batgirl is one of the four main playable characters in the 2022 video game Gotham Knights, voiced by America Young.

Batman: Arkham

Throughout the Batman Arkham series, Barbara Gordon is voiced by Kimberly Brooks in Arkham Asylum and Arkham City, by Kelsey Lansdowne in Arkham Origins, and by Ashley Greene in Arkham Knight.

In Batman: Arkham Asylum, she communicates with Batman over the radio during Batman's time in the Asylum to help the Dark Knight deduce the Joker's latest plan. She never appears in person but an artist's drawing of her is seen in her bio.
In Batman: Arkham City, Alfred Pennyworth serves as Batman's guide over the radio for the first part of the game, and Oracle first appears in the Museum over the radio. No reason is given as to her absence up to that point. She and Alfred talk to Batman over the radio helping stop Hugo Strange, track other inmates and villains like Deadshot as well as intercepting radio broadcasts and aiding the Dark Knight in various side missions.
In Batman: Arkham Origins, her father James Gordon is initially hostile to Batman unlike the teenage Barbara. While Barbara immediately expresses admiration, she helps Batman access the National Criminal Database in the GCPD. She eventually manages to hack into Batman's communicator and asks help in finding and disabling the Penguin's weapon caches, working alongside the Dark Knight for the first time.
In Batman: Arkham Knight, Oracle helps Batman track down Scarecrow at the start, but is later kidnapped by the Arkham Knight. After Batman has a flashback of Barbara's paralysis and Gordon breaks off their alliance with Batman. Batman then goes on a quest to find and save her but is tragically too late. The Scarecrow apparently subjects her to his newest toxin and she goes mad, committing suicide. This drives Batman to become more determined than ever to stop Scarecrow and the Arkham Knight. But she is later revealed to be still alive - her death was part of another fear-toxin-induced hallucination. After Batman rescues Barbara and brings her to the GCPD for protection, she helps the Dark Knight fight off a wave of the Scarecrow's militia's drone forces and is shown to be engaged to Tim Drake at the end of the game. Batgirl appears as the playable protagonist of the DLC story mission Batgirl: A Matter of Family (set before the events of Batman: Arkham Asylum), wherein she and Robin infiltrate a defunct oil rig and battle the Joker and Harley Quinn, who have kidnapped Commissioner Gordon and other police officers. Oracle also makes an appearance in the Robin-focused DLC mission A Flip of a Coin (set a few weeks after the main story's ending), where she assists Robin in apprehending Two-Face at Hell's Gate Disposal Services.

Actresses

References

Batgirl